Originally produced as Konica Minolta AF Zoom DT 18-200mm 3.5-6.3 (D) by Konica Minolta in 2005, and currently produced by Sony, the Sony α DT 18-200mm 3.5-6.3 (SAL-18200) is compatible with cameras using the Minolta A-mount and Sony A-mount lens mounts. The DT designation means this lens is designed to be used with a camera with an APS-C size sensor. When the 1.5× crop factor is considered, the lens has an effective equivalent 27–300mm focal length.
The lens is derived from the Tamron AF 18-200mm f/3.5-6.3 XR Di II LD Aspherical [IF] (models A14M/A14S).

See also
 List of Konica Minolta A-mount lenses
 List of Minolta A-mount lenses

Sources
Dyxum lens data

External links
Sony: SAL-18200: 18-200mm F3.5-6.3 lens

18-200
Superzoom lenses
Camera lenses introduced in 2005